The Changzhou North railway station is a high-speed railway station in Changzhou, Jiangsu, China. It serves the Beijing–Shanghai high-speed railway. The station is a stop on Line 1 of the Changzhou Metro.

See also
Changzhou railway station

Railway stations in Jiangsu
Railway stations in China opened in 2010
Railway stations in Changzhou
Changzhou Metro stations